Sidra may refer to:
Sidra (name)

Places 
Gulf of Sidra, a body of water in the Mediterranean Sea on the northern coast of Libya
Sidra, Libya, a Libyan port
Sidra, Sokółka County, a village in Poland
Gmina Sidra, a Polish administrative district
Rio Sidra, a town in Kuna Yala territory, Panama

Food and beverages 
The Spanish, Catalan, and Portuguese word for cider
Apple Sidra, a Taiwanese cola
Cucurbita ficifolia, a type of squash grown for its edible seeds, fruit, and greens

Judaism 
The Weekly Torah portion in Judaism
A variation on Seder, a subdivision of the biblical books in the masoretic text

Other 
Sidra Intersection, software package for traffic design

See also
Sidrat al-Muntaha